William Roffen Esterson (born 27 October 1966) is a British Labour Party politician who has served as Member of Parliament (MP) for Sefton Central since 2010. He has been Shadow Minister for International Trade since 2016. He was Shadow Minister for Small Business from 2015 to 2020.

Education and early life

Esterson attended Sir Joseph Williamson's Mathematical School in Rochester, Kent. He holds a joint degree in Mathematics and Philosophy from the University of Leeds. He trained with a large accountancy firm and subsequently became director of a training consultancy.

Career
Prior to being elected as an MP, he was the Labour Councillor for River Ward in Medway, a unitary authority in Kent. When Medway Council was created in 1997, Esterson was elected to represent Town Ward. He represented Town Ward until 2003, when boundary changes were implemented. He was a previous councillor for St Margaret's and Borstal ward on Rochester-upon-Medway City Council which was dissolved to form Medway Council. He has served on the Environment, Food and Rural Affairs; Education; Community and Local Government; and Treasury Select Committees.

Esterson contributed to the Hillsborough debate in the House of Commons on 17 October 2011 by reading directly the words of a bereaved father. In September 2011 he contributed to the book What next for Labour? Ideas for a new generation, his piece was entitled A Campaigning Party.

In January 2015, Esterson proposed a bill which would introduce compulsory labelling of alcoholic drinks warning about potential dangers from drinking during pregnancy. He was made Shadow Minister for Small Business following Jeremy Corbyn's election as Leader of the Labour Party in September 2015. However, he supported Owen Smith in the failed attempt to replace Corbyn in the 2016 leadership election. In October 2016, he was made Shadow Minister for International Trade.

Esterson endorsed Keir Starmer in the 2020 Labour Party leadership election. After Starmer's victory in the contest, Esterson was stood down as Shadow Small Business Minister but reappointed as Shadow International Trade Minister. He became Shadow Minister for Business and Industry as part of Starmer's shadow cabinet reshuffle.

Personal life
Esterson is married with eight children.

References

External links

Official website

1966 births
Living people
Alumni of the University of Leeds
Labour Party (UK) MPs for English constituencies
UK MPs 2010–2015
UK MPs 2015–2017
UK MPs 2017–2019
UK MPs 2019–present
Politicians from Manchester
People educated at Sir Joseph Williamson's Mathematical School